The University of the Southwest is a private Christian university located in Hobbs, New Mexico. The university was incorporated under as College of the Southwest in 1962, although the college had existed for several years prior as a two-year Baptist educational institution.

The University of the Southwest grants baccalaureate degrees in Arts and Sciences, Business, and Education. The university also offers both an MBA and Masters of Science in Education program. It is accredited by the Higher Learning Commission.

History 
The University of the Southwest was founded by B. Clarence Evans as Hobbs Baptist College in 1956. It operated as a two-year junior college until 1958 when it was renamed New Mexico Baptist College in 1958 and began granting four-year degrees.

In 1961, the college moved to site just north of Hobbs, New Mexico and was re-established as an interdenominational private four-year liberal arts college. In 1962 it was renamed as the College of the Southwest, and in 2008 its name was again changed to its current name as the University of the Southwest.

Academics 
University of the Southwest grants degrees in over fifty undergraduate and fifteen graduate programs. These programs operate within three academic schools at the University.

 School of Arts and Science
 School of Business & Professional Studies
 School of Education

Athletics 
The University of the Southwest (USW) athletics teams are called the Mustangs. The university is a member of the National Association of Intercollegiate Athletics (NAIA), primarily competing in the Red River Athletic Conference (RRAC) for most of its sports since the 1998–99 academic year; while its women's golf team competes in the Sooner Athletic Conference (SAC). The Mustangs previously competed as an NAIA Independent from 1994–95 (when the school began its athletics program and joined the NAIA) to 1997–98.

USW competes in 13 intercollegiate varsity sports: Men's sports include baseball, basketball, cross country, golf, soccer and tennis; while women's sports include basketball, cross country, golf, soccer, softball, tennis and volleyball. Former sports included men's & women's track & field.

On March 15, 2022, a 2017 Ford Transit van containing members of the university's men's and women's golf teams was involved in a collision in Andrews County, Texas. The golf teams had been returning from a golf tournament in Midland, Texas. A pick-up truck crossed the center line of two-lane highway FM 1788 and struck the golf team van head on killing nine people, including six students and the golf team's coach. Two of the deceased students were international students from Portugal and Mexico. Two students, both from Canada, survived the crash. The driver of the pick-up truck and the passenger were also killed.

Notable alumni 

  Khalid Abdulkhalik - Darfur national football team player

Activities 
There are twelve student organizations at University of the Southwest. These student organizations operate in the areas of professionalism, academic honors, ministry, and civics. The university supports an intramural sports program wherein students, staff, and faculty participate.

University of the Southwest hosts the Jack Maddox Distinguished Lecture Series.

References

External links
 
 Official athletics website

University of the Southwest
University of the Southwest
Educational institutions established in 1962
Red River Athletic Conference
Education in Lea County, New Mexico
Council for Christian Colleges and Universities
1962 establishments in New Mexico